In enzymology, a 3-oxoacyl-[acyl-carrier-protein] reductase (NADH) is an enzyme that catalyzes the chemical reaction

(3R)-3-hydroxyacyl-[acyl-carrier-protein] + NAD+  3-oxoacyl-[acyl-carrier-protein] + NADH + H+

Thus, the two substrates of this enzyme are [[(3R)-3-hydroxyacyl-[acyl-carrier-protein]]] and NAD+, whereas its 3 products are [[3-oxoacyl-[acyl-carrier-protein]]], NADH, and H+.

This enzyme belongs to the family of oxidoreductases, specifically those acting on the CH-OH group of donor with NAD+ or NADP+ as acceptor. The systematic name of this enzyme class is (3R)-3-hydroxyacyl-[acyl-carrier-protein]:NAD+ oxidoreductase. Other names in common use include 3-oxoacyl-[acyl carrier protein] (reduced nicotinamide adenine, dinucleotide) reductase, and 3-oxoacyl-[acyl-carrier-protein] reductase (NADH).

References

 

EC 1.1.1
NADH-dependent enzymes
Enzymes of unknown structure